The women's 100 metres at the 2012 European Athletics Championships were held at the Helsinki Olympic Stadium on 27 and 28 June.

Medalists

Records

Schedule

Results

Round 1
First 3 in each heat (Q) and 4 best performers (q) advance to the Semifinals.

Wind:Heat 1: −0.3 m/s, Heat 2: +1.7 m/s, Heat 3: −0.3 m/s, Heat 4: +1.0 m/s

Semifinals
First 3 in each heat (Q) and 2 best performers (q) advance to the Final.

Wind:Heat 1: 0.0 m/s, Heat 2: +2.0 m/s

Final
Wind: −0.7 m/s

References

 Round 1 Results
 Semifinal Results
 Final Results

100 W
100 metres at the European Athletics Championships
2012 in women's athletics